Aiello (or Ajello) is a surname of Italian origin. People with the name include:

Annette Aiello (born 1941), American zoologist and botanical entomologist
Antonio Aiello (born 1985), Italian singer
Barbara Aiello, Italian rabbi; first female rabbi in Italy
Beatrice Aiello, Italian actress and artist
Carl R. Ajello (born 1932), Attorney General of Connecticut
Cedric Aiello, French DJ of mixed Italian-Algerian origin
Danny Aiello (1933–2019), American actor
Danny Aiello III (1957–2010), American stunt man and film actor; son of Danny Aiello
Edith Ajello (born 1944), American politician
Elena Aiello (1895–1961), Italian Roman Catholic nun
Francesco de Aiello (died 1453), Roman Catholic Archbishop of Bari-Canosa, of Todi and Bishop of Cava de' Tirreni 
Gaetan Ajello (1883–1983), Italian-born American architect
Gianni Aiello, bassist and vocalist of the  American rock music group Naked Giants
Giovanni d'Aiello (died 1169), Roman Catholic Bishop of Catania 
Joe Aiello (1891–1930), American Prohibition mobster who feuded with Al Capone
John of Ajello (died 1169), Italian Roman Catholic Bishop
Jorge Aiello (born 1978), Argentine footballer 
Josie Aiello,  American singer-songwriter
Laurent Aïello (born 1969), French race car driver
Leslie C. Aiello (born 1946), American paleoanthropologist and academic
Luigia Carlucci Aiello (born 1946), Italian computer scientist
Matthew of Ajello (died 1193). Sicilian chancellor
Nicholas of Ajello (died 1221), Italian Roman Catholic archbishop 
Piero Aiello (born 1956), Italian politician
Piera Aiello (born 1967), Italian police informant and politician
Renato D'Aiello (born 1959), Italian saxophonist resident in London
Rosaria Aiello (born 1989), Italian water polo player
Stevie Aiello (born 1983), American songwriter, musician, and record producer
Tony Aiello (1921–2012), American football player
Tony Aiello (born 1963), American television reporter in New York City
Vincenzo Ajello, Master of the Order of Preachers from 184 until 1850, commenter of St. Thomas Aquinas
Wynne Ajello (1903–1992), English soprano singer

Notes 

Surnames of Italian origin
Italian-language surnames